The 1989 Syracuse Orangemen football team represented Syracuse University during the 1989 NCAA Division I-A football season. The team was led by ninth-year head coach Dick MacPherson and played their home games in the Carrier Dome in Syracuse, New York. Syracuse finished with an 8–4 record and played in the 1989 Peach Bowl, where they beat Georgia, 19–18. They also played a regular season game in Tokyo, Japan, in the Coca-Cola Classic against Louisville.

Schedule

Sources:

References

Syracuse
Syracuse Orange football seasons
Peach Bowl champion seasons
Syracuse Orangemen football